Eupithecia scaphiata is a moth in the family Geometridae. It is found in the high Andes of Ecuador.

References

Moths described in 1993
scaphiata
Moths of South America